This page details statistics of the Leinster Senior Hurling Championship.

General performances

By county

Teams

Winning Teams

Winners By decade
The most successful team of each decade, judged by number of Leinster Senior Hurling Championship titles, is as follows:

 1880s: 1 each for Kilkenny (1888) and Dublin (1889)
 1890s: 4 for Kilkenny (1893-95-97-98)
 1900s: 6 for Kilkenny (1900-03-04-05-07-09)
 1910s: 4 for Kilkenny (1911-12-13-16)
 1920s: 5 each for Dublin (1920-21-24-27-28) and Kilkenny (1922-23-25-26-29)
 1930s: 7 for Kilkenny (1931-32-33-35-36-37-39)
 1940s: 5 for Kilkenny (1940-43-45-46-47)
 1950s: 5 for Kilkenny (1950-53-57-58-59)
 1960s: 4 each for Wexford (1960-62-65-68) and Kilkenny (1963-66-67-69)
 1970s: 7 for Kilkenny (1971-72-73-74-75-78-79)
 1980s: 6 for Offaly (1980-81-84-85-88-89)
 1990s: 5 for Kilkenny (1991-92-93-98-99)
 2000s: 9 for Kilkenny (2000-01-02-03-05-06-07-08-09)
 2010s: 5 for Kilkenny (2010-11-14-15-16)
 2020s: 3 for Kilkenny (2020-21-22)

Other records

Biggest wins

 The most one sided Leinster finals since 1896 when goals were made equal to three points:
 21 points – 1901: Wexford 7-6 (27) – (6) 1-3 Offaly
 19 points – 2008: Kilkenny 5-21 (36) – (17) 0-17 Wexford
 18 points – 1896: Dublin 4-6 (18) – (0) 0-00 Kilkenny

Successful defending

All 6 teams of the 6 who have won the Leinster championship have successfully defended the title. These are:
 Kilkenny on 40 attempts out of 71 (1898, 1904, 1905, 1912, 1913, 1923, 1926, 1932, 1933, 1936, 1937, 1940, 1946, 1947, 1958, 1959, 1967, 1972, 1973, 1974, 1975, 1979, 1983, 1987, 1992, 1993, 1999, 2000, 2001, 2002, 2003, 2006, 2007, 2008, 2009, 2010, 2011, 2015, 2016, 2021, 2022)
 Wexford on 5 attempts out of 19 (1891, 1955, 1956, 1977, 1997)
 Dublin on 4 attempts out of 23 (1920, 1921, 1928, 1942)
 Offaly on 4 attempts out of 8 (1981, 1985, 1989, 1990)
 Galway on 1 attempts out of 3 (2018)
 Laois on 1 attempts out of 2 (1915)

Gaps

 The longest gaps between successive Leinster titles:
 52 years: Dublin (1961–2013)
 34 years: Laois (1915–1949)
 33 years: Wexford (1918–1951)
 19 years: Wexford (1977–1996)

Longest undefeated run

The record for the longest unbeaten run stands at 15 games held by Kilkenny. It began with a 6-28 to 0-15 win against Offaly in the semi-final of the 2005 championship and finished with a 2-21 to 0-9 defeat of Dublin in the Leinster semi-final of the 2012 championship. The 15-game unbeaten streak, which included no drawn games, ended with a 2-21 to 2-11 loss to Galway in the 2012 Leinster final.

Comprehensive team results by tournament 
9 county teams have participated in at least one edition of the Leinster Senior Hurling Championship since 2018. Dublin, Galway, Kilkenny and Wexford have been ever-presents in the last six editions.

 Legend

  – Champions
  – Runners-up
  – Group Stage/Quarter-Finals/Semi-Finals
  – Relegated
 JM – Joe McDonagh Cup
 CR – Christy Ring Cup

For each tournament, the number of teams in each finals tournament (in brackets) are shown.

Players

Top scorers

All time

This is a list of players who have scored a cumulative total of 100 points or more in the Leinster Championship.

By year

Single game

Finals

All-time appearances

Leinster final appearances

See also
 All-Ireland Senior Hurling Championship records and statistics
 Munster Senior Hurling Championship records and statistics

References

Hurling records and statistics
Records